Mate Bajić (born 3 November 1995) is a German-born Croatian professional footballer, who plays for Tomislav Cerna.

Career

Cibalia
In August 2012, Bajić signed his first professional contract with HNK Cibalia in Croatia’s 1. HNL. He made his debut on 26 May 2013, in the final round of the 2012–13 Croatian First Football League. He entered as a substitute in the 67th minute in Cibalia’s away loss to NK Osijek, what proved to be the club's last top-tier match. Although Cibalia was relegated to 2. HNL, Bajić stayed with the club during 2013–14 and the first half of 2014–15.

Rijeka
In February 2015, Bajić signed a contract with HNK Rijeka in 1. HNL that ties him with the club until June 2017. In his first half-season with the club, Bajić played for Rijeka II in 3. HNL. During the 2015–16 season, Bajić was a regular starter for Rijeka II, scoring 6 goals.

In January 2016, Bajić was one of several Rijeka II players who were brought in to the first-team’s pre-season training camp in Dubai. He was capped in four of Rijeka’s mid-season friendlies. However, following the end of the season, Rijeka did not renew his contract.

References

External links

Profile and statistics at Sportmanager.hr

1995 births
Living people
Footballers from Dortmund
Association football forwards
Croatian footballers
Croatia youth international footballers
HNK Cibalia players
HNK Rijeka II players
NK BSK Bijelo Brdo players
Croatian Football League players
First Football League (Croatia) players